Underground Album is the 21st studio album by American country musician David Allan Coe. It was released as a mail order album, not sold in stores, only through the back pages of the motorcycling magazine Easyriders and in the concession stand at his shows. Underground Album is Coe's follow-up to his 1978 album Nothing Sacred.

Reception 

The album was generally criticized as being profane, racist, and crude. AllMusic, which did not review the album, gave it three out of five stars. "Nigger Fucker" resulted in Coe being accused of racism. Neil Strauss described the album's material as "among the most racist, misogynist, homophobic and obscene songs recorded by a popular songwriter." Coe responded to the accusations by stating "Anyone that hears this album and says I'm a racist is full of shit". He also stated that he contacted Strauss during the writing of the article, but Strauss only acknowledged talking to Coe's manager, who would only comment off the record.

Track listing 
All songs written by David Allan Coe.

"Rock a Roll Fever" - 3:10
"Panheads Forever" - 3:09
"Nigger Fucker" - 2:28
"Coffee" - 5:28
"One Monkey" - 3:14
"One More Time" - 3:13
"Little Sussie Shallow Throat" - 2:57
"Pick Em, Lick Em, Stick Em" - 2:56
"Don't Bite the Dick" - 2:27
"Fuckin' in the Butt" - 2:11

References

External links
 David Allan Coe Underground CD

David Allan Coe albums
1982 albums
LGBT-related controversies in music
Race-related controversies in music
Anti-black racism in the United States